David Kross (born 4 July 1990) is a German actor. He began his career at a young age with a small role in the 2002 film Hilfe, ich bin ein Junge and worked sporadically, mainly focusing on his school work. In 2008, he won the starring role of Michael Berg in the film The Reader. For his part, he was nominated for various awards and went on to win the Sierra Award at the Las Vegas Film Critics Society Awards for Youth in Film.

Kross has since worked in both German and English speaking film roles, including War Horse,  Race and Into the White.

Early life 
Kross was born in Henstedt-Ulzburg, 20 miles north of Hamburg. He grew up in Bargteheide, where he attended Eckhorst High School until 2007. He has two brothers and one sister. He played basketball at the professional club TSV Bargteheide between 2004 and 2006.

Career 
His career started with a small appearance in the 2002 film Hilfe, ich bin ein Junge (English: Help, I'm a Boy!). In December 2003, he joined Blaues Wölkchen, a small group from a children's theatre in Bargteheide. His first major theatrical appearance was in Hilfe, die Herdmanns kommen.

In 2005, Kross came to the attention of Detlev Buck through his daughter, Bernadette, and he auditioned for Tough Enough (Knallhart); Buck hired Kross to play the lead, a 15-year-old boy who moves with his mother from a rich neighborhood of Berlin (Zehlendorf) to the Neukölln area, known at the time for its high number of Turkish immigrants and high crime level. Kross not only won praise at Berlinale in 2006, but also won Best Actor in Nuremberg at the 11th Filmfestival Türkei/Deutschland.

In 2006, Kross worked again with Buck in the film  (Hände weg von Mississippi), playing an apprentice baker. In the fall of the same year, he started shooting a film by Marco Kreuzpaintner, Krabat (The Satanic Mill). In this version of Otfried Preußler's children's book, Kross plays the title role, one of the apprentices of magic, with co-stars Daniel Brühl and Robert Stadlober. The film was released on 19 September 2007 in movie festivals and in October 2008 in theatres.

In September 2007, The Reader began shooting in Berlin, Cologne, and Görlitz. In Stephen Daldry's adaption of the best-selling novel by Bernhard Schlink about the relationship between a teenage boy and an older woman, Kross plays the lead role of Michael Berg, opposite Kate Winslet, Ralph Fiennes, and Bruno Ganz. He had to learn to speak English to appear in the film. The world premiere was at the Ziegfeld Theatre in New York on 3 December 2008. The film was presented in the 2009 Berlinale but did not compete. In May 2009, Kross was honored for his performance in The Reader at the 62nd Cannes Festival, winning the Chopard trophy. Kross was nominated for a European Film Award as best actor.

His next work was in Same Same But Different (2009), again with Buck directing. The script is based on an autobiographical article by Benjamin Prüfer.

In June 2010, it was announced that Kross had been cast in Steven Spielberg's film War Horse. Filming started in August 2010, in Dartmoor, Devon, U.K. and the film was released in December 2011.

Personal life
In 2009, Kross started a three-year course at London Academy of Music and Dramatic Art (LAMDA). His plan was to improve his acting and English skills. However, he dropped out at the end of the same year to concentrate on films. He has since lived in Berlin-Mitte. Kross has expressed no desire to move to Hollywood, preferring to stay in Germany and continue making both German and English language films.

Filmography

Awards 

 At the 11th Germany/Turkey Film Festival in Nuremberg, David won his first award as "Actor in a Leading Role" for his performance in Detlev Bucks Tough Enough (German: Knallhart).
 2008 Nominated for a Chicago Film Critics Association Awards in Most Promising Performer.
 2009 Nominated in the Broadcast Film Critics Association Awards in Best Young Actor / Actress (Under 21).
 2009 Won a Las Vegas Film Critics Society Award in Youth in Film.
 2009 Shooting Stars Award, at the Berlin International Film Festival, annual acting awards for up-and-coming actors by European Film Promotion.
 2009 Nominated for a European Film Award.
 2010 Shooting Stars Award at Romy TV-Awards, together with Cristiana Capotondi.
 2010 Audi Generation Award.
 2012 Won the Chopard Throphy for male Revelation at the Cannes Film Festival.

References

External links 
 

1990 births
German male film actors
Living people
People from Henstedt-Ulzburg
21st-century German male actors
German male child actors
Chopard Trophy for Male Revelation winners